Trefl Gdańsk, previously known as Lotos Trefl Gdańsk, is a professional men's volleyball club based in Gdańsk in northern Poland. The club was founded in 2005 and promoted to the Polish PlusLiga in 2011. Two–time Polish Cup winner (2015, 2018).

Honours
 Polish Cup
Winners (2): 2014–15, 2017–18

 Polish SuperCup
Winners (1): 2015–16

Club history

Trefl Gdańsk was founded in 2005, and began its history in the 2nd Polish Volleyball League, playing there until 2007. The club was promoted to PlusLiga in 2008 after spending just one season in the 1st Polish Volleyball League. Unfortunately, Trefl did not manage to stay in the league for long and has been relegated in the next season, in 2009. They had to wait until 2011 when led by Dariusz Luks the club was once again promoted to PlusLiga, playing there until this day.

In June 2014, an Italian expert Andrea Anastasi was officially presented as the club's new head coach. Anastasi was a head coach of the Polish national team in 2011–2013, and expressed a desire to work for the club from Gdańsk. Damian Schulz, Mateusz Mika and Wojciech Grzyb signed a contract with the club before the 2014–15 PlusLiga season. The team took 3rd place in  the regular season of PlusLiga in which Anastasi's team won 19 and lost 7 matches. On 23 February 2015, Andrea Anastasi signed a new two–year contract, until 2017. Lotos Trefl advanced to the final of the 2014–15 PlusLiga season after winning in the semifinal against the Polish Champion PGE Skra Bełchatów in four matches (3–1). It was the first, historical promotion to the final of the Polish Championship. On 19 April 2015, the team competed in the final of the Polish Cup at Ergo Arena, and has sensationally beaten Asseco Resovia, winning the Cup for the first time in club's history. In the final of the 2014–15 PlusLiga season, Trefl Gdańsk lost to Asseco Resovia in three matches (0–3), and ended the season with silver medals.

On 28 October 2015, during the 2015 Polish SuperCup held at Arena Poznań in Poznań, Trefl defeated the Polish Champion Asseco Resovia in five sets (3–2), and won its first Polish SuperCup. During the 2015–16 PlusLiga season, the club also competed in the CEV Champions League. In the Playoff 12 stage Trefl lost to Russian club Zenit Kazan, the future competition champion (1–3, 0–3). In the domestic league, the club ended the season in 4th place.

The 2016–17 PlusLiga season did not end well for Trefl. The club did not manage to play in the PlusLiga playoffs, and lost in a match for seventh place to Cerrad Czarni Radom (3–2, 1–3).

During the 2017–18 PlusLiga season, the club won its 2nd Polish Cup, winning with PGE Skra Bełchatów in three sets (3–0). The club ended the season in 3rd place and gained the right to compete in the next CEV Champions League edition.

Anastasi remained as the club's head coach until 2019. During his last season as a head coach, the club competed in the 2018–19 CEV Champions League. The club not only won its group, losing only one time to PGE Skra Bełchatów but was also close to eliminate Zenit Kazan (the reigning European champion of that time) in the quarterfinal. Trefl lost its first match held at Ergo Arena, Gdańsk (2–3), but managed to win the second match held in Kazan (3–2). Eventually, the club lost in the golden set (12–15) and has been eliminated from the further competition. Andrea Anastasi was succeeded by the former Polish volleyball player – Michał Winiarski, as the head coach of Trefl on 6 June 2019.

Team
As of 2022–23 season

Coaching staff

Players

Season by season

See also

References

External links
 Official website 
 Team profile at PlusLiga.pl 
 Team profile at Volleybox.net

Polish volleyball clubs
Sport in Gdańsk
Volleyball clubs established in 2005
2005 establishments in Poland